Supernatural Birth Machine is the fourth album by British doom metal band Cathedral, released in November 12, 1996 by Earache.

Track listing

Personnel

Cathedral
 Lee Dorrian – vocals 
 Garry Jennings – guitar, mellotron (1, 5), piano (6)
 Leo Smee – bass
 Brian Dixon – drums

Technical personnel
 Kit Woolven – production, engineering
 Doug Cook – assistant engineering
 Noel Summerville – mastering
 Antz White – art direction, design, digital image manipulation
 Dave Patchett – cover painting
 George Chin – band photographs

References

Cathedral (band) albums
1996 albums
Earache Records albums